Cicadas of the genus Neotibicen are large-bodied insects of the family Cicadidae that appear in summer or early fall in eastern North America.   Common names include cicada, harvestfly, jar fly, and the misnomer locust. In 2015, these species were moved from the genus Tibicen (now genus Lyristes Horvath, 1926), which was redefined in the twenty-first century to include only a few European species, while species from the Western United States and Mexico are now placed in a separate genus, Hadoa. In addition, several former Neotibicen species have been moved to the genus Megatibicen.

Neotibicen species are the most commonly encountered cicadas in the eastern United States. Unlike periodical cicadas, whose appearances aboveground occur at 13- or 17-year intervals, Neotibicen species can be seen every year, hence their nickname "annual cicadas". Despite their annual appearances, Neotibicen probably take multiple years to develop underground, because all cicada species for which life cycle lengths have been measured do so, except when growing as agricultural pests. Their annual reappearance is presumably due to overlapping generations.

The fore wings are about twice the length of the hindwings. Adults feed using their beak to tap into the xylem of plants; nymphs feed from the xylem of roots.

Communication
Like other members of the subfamily Cicadinae, Neotibicen species have loud, complex songs, even (in many cases) with distinct song phrases.

Males produce loud calls in the afternoon or evening (depending on the species) to attract females. These sounds, distinctive for each species, are produced by specialized tymbal organs on the abdomen as in most cicadas. These calls range from a loud buzz to a long rattling sound, sometimes with a pulsating quality.

Species and subspecies 
These species and subspecies belong to the genus Neotibicen. Several species formerly in this genus were recently moved to Megatibicen.

 Neotibicen auriferus (Say, 1825) – Field cicada
 Neotibicen bermudianus (Verrill, 1902) – Bermuda cicada, PRESUMED EXTINCT
 Neotibicen canicularis (Harris, 1841) – Dog-day cicada or dog-day harvestfly
 Neotibicen davisi
 Neotibicen davisi davisi (Smith and Grossbeck, 1907) – Davis's southeastern dog-day cicada
 Neotibicen davisi harnedi (Davis, 1918)
 Neotibicen latifasciatus (Davis, 1915) – Coastal scissor grinder cicada
 Neotibicen linnei (Smith and Grossbeck, 1907) – Linne's cicada
 Neotibicen lyricen
 Neotibicen lyricen engelhardti (Davis, 1910)
 Neotibicen lyricen lyricen (De Geer, 1773) – Lyric cicada
 Neotibicen lyricen virescens (Davis, 1935)
 Neotibicen pruinosus
 Neotibicen pruinosus fulvus (Beamer, 1924)
 Neotibicen pruinosus pruinosus (Say, 1825) – Scissor grinder cicada
 Neotibicen robinsonianus (Davis, 1922) – Robinson's cicada
 Neotibicen similaris
 Neotibicen similaris apalachicola Marshall and Hill, 2017
 Neotibicen similaris similaris (Smith and Grossbeck, 1907) – Similar dog-day cicada
 Neotibicen superbus (Fitch, 1855) – Superb southwestern cicada
 Neotibicen tibicen
 Neotibicen tibicen australis (Davis, 1912)
 Neotibicen tibicen tibicen (= Tibicen chloromerus) (Linnaeus, 1758) – Swamp cicada
 Neotibicen winnemanna (Davis, 1912) – Eastern scissor grinder cicada

Predators

Many animals feed on cicadas, which usually occurs during the final days when they become easy prey near the ground.  One of the more notable predators is the cicada killer. This is a large wasp that catches the dog-day cicada. After catching and stinging the insect to paralyze it, the cicada killer carries it back to its hole and drags it underground to a chamber where it lays its eggs in the paralyzed cicada. When the eggs hatch, the wasp larvae feed on the paralyzed, but still living, cicada.

Gallery

References

External links

Massachusetts Cicadas
InsectSingers.com. - acoustic signaling insects

Cryptotympanini
Cicadidae genera